The 1998 season was the Kansas City Chiefs' 39th in the National Football League (NFL) and their 29th overall.
 
The season began with the team hoping to not only improve on their 13–3 campaign the previous season but to also avenge their loss in the 1998 playoffs against the eventual Super Bowl champion Denver Broncos. However, instead, the Chiefs failed to succeed in the highly competitive AFC West.

Kansas City began the season on a bright spot, with a 4–1 record and three wins against division rivals; however they then endured a 6-game losing streak, dropping their record to 4–7, and the team finished with a 7–9 record and 4th place in the AFC West. The biggest low point of the season was during a Week 11 matchup against their division rival Denver Broncos, in which the Chiefs defense were penalized five times on the same drive, including three penalties by linebacker Derrick Thomas, topping off an embarrassing 30–7 loss. Following the season, head coach Marty Schottenheimer announced his intention to resign after ten seasons with the team, and defensive coordinator Gunther Cunningham assumed coaching duties for 1999.

This was the first time Derrick Thomas was not named to the Pro Bowl roster.

Offseason
On April 9, Marcus Allen announced his retirement.

NFL draft

Personnel

Staff

Roster

Preseason

Regular season
The Chiefs began the season well on September 6 with an impressive performance and easily defeated the Oakland Raiders at Arrowhead 28–8. Kansas City sacked the Raiders quarterbacks 10 times, with Derrick Thomas collecting 6 by himself.

On September 13, Kansas City fell to the Jacksonville Jaguars on the road, 21–16.

On September 27, the Chiefs visited the Philadelphia Eagles for the first time in franchise history.

On October 4, Kansas City conquered the Seattle Seahawks and the rain at Arrowhead, 17–6. Rich Gannon hit Andre Rison for an 80-yard touchdown pass after a 54-minute rain delay caused by a violent storm. The two teams combined for nine turnovers, five by Kansas City. The win improved the Chiefs' record to 4–1, however a 6-game losing streak following this game dropped the team to 4–7.

On November 16, against the Denver Broncos, the Chiefs defense was penalized five times on one drive, three of the penalties coming from legendary linebacker Derrick Thomas. The game is known now by Chiefs fans as the "Monday Night Meltdown". After that it was all downhill as the Chiefs suffered their first losing season since 1988.

Schedule

Note: Intra-division opponents are in bold text.

Game summaries

Week 1: vs. Oakland Raiders

Week 2: at Jacksonville Jaguars

Week 3: vs. San Diego Chargers

Week 4: at Philadelphia Eagles

Week 5: vs. Seattle Seahawks

Week 6: at New England Patriots

Week 8: vs. Pittsburgh Steelers

Week 9: vs. New York Jets

Week 10: at Seattle Seahawks

Week 11: vs. Denver Broncos

Week 12: at San Diego Chargers

Week 13: vs. Arizona Cardinals

Week 14: at Denver Broncos

Week 15: vs. Dallas Cowboys

Week 16: at New York Giants

Week 17: at Oakland Raiders

Standings

Awards and records
The team was penalized 158 times for 1,304 yards, an NFL record that stood until the Oakland Raiders surpassed it in 2011.

References

Kansas City Chiefs
Kansas City Chiefs seasons
Kansas